Kemp & Lauritzen is an engineering company based in Copenhagen, Denmark. The company has 2500 employees.

History
The company was founded on 16 December 1882 by Otto Niels Kemp (1845-1905) and Severin Lauritzen (1850-1924). In 1954, the privately held company was converted into a limited company. In 1982, Axel Muusfeldt, the CEO and main shareholder of the company, set up a new foundation,  Axel Muusfeldts Fond, which received his shares in the company at the event of his death in 1989.

References

External links
 Official website

Construction and civil engineering companies of Denmark
Companies based in Albertslund Municipality
Construction and civil engineering companies established in 1882
Danish companies established in 1882